Bushong (Bushoong) is a Bantu language of the Kasai region of Democratic Republic of the Congo. It was the language of the Kuba Kingdom.

Alternative names are Bushongo, Busoong, Shongo, Ganga, Kuba, Mbale, Bamongo, Mongo.

Dialects are said to be Djembe, Ngende, Ngombe (Ngombia), Ngongo, Pianga (Panga, Tsobwa, Shobwa, Shoba). Pianga (Shuwa) is a distinct language, in the Tetela group.

The Bushong have a patron–client relationship with the Kasai Twa.

References

 J. Vansina, Esquisse de Grammaire Bushong, Commission Linguistique Africaine, Tervuren 1959.

Bushoong languages
Languages of the Democratic Republic of the Congo